Neil Andre Pallante (born September 18, 1998) is an American professional baseball pitcher for the St. Louis Cardinals of Major League Baseball (MLB). He made his MLB debut in 2022.

Born and raised in Orange County, California, Pallante played three season of college baseball at the University of California, Irvine. The Cardinals selected him in the fourth round of the 2019 MLB draft. He was in their minor league system for four seasons before making his MLB debut in 2022, splitting time between a relief role and their starting rotation.

Amateur career
Pallante attended San Clemente High School in San Clemente, California, where he played baseball and was teammates with Kolby Allard and Michael McGreevy. As a junior in 2015, he pitched to a 1.72 ERA over a team leading  innings. In 2016, his senior season, he went 6-3 with a 1.02 ERA. 

Following high school, Pallante enrolled at the University of California, Irvine where he played college baseball for the Anteaters. After his freshman year in 2017, Pallante played collegiate summer baseball for the Chatham Anglers of the Cape Cod Baseball League. In 2018, as a sophomore, he started 15 games and went 10–1 with a 1.60 ERA, second lowest in school history. He was selected to play for the USA Baseball Collegiate National Team that summer. As a junior at UC Irvine, Pallante started 15 games and compiled a 10–4 record and 2.68 ERA over 94 innings. After the season, he was selected by the St. Louis Cardinals in the fourth round of the 2019 Major League Baseball draft.

Professional career
Pallante signed with the Cardinals and made his professional debut with the State College Spikes of the Class A Short Season New York–Penn League, going 1–0 with a 2.78 ERA over  innings. He did not play a minor league game in 2020 due to the cancellation of the minor league season caused by the COVID-19 pandemic. For a majority of the 2021 season, Pallante played with the Springfield Cardinals of the Double-A Central and started 21 games in which he went 4–7 with a 3.82 ERA and 82 strikeouts over  innings. After the end of Springfield's season in mid-September, he was promoted to the Memphis Redbirds of the Triple-A East, with whom he appeared in two games. He was selected to play in the Arizona Fall League for the Glendale Desert Dogs after the season where he was named to the Fall Stars Game.

Pallante was a non-roster invitee to spring training in 2022, and on April 4, the Cardinals announced that he had been named to the Opening Day roster. He made his MLB debut on April 10 versus the Pittsburgh Pirates, throwing one inning in relief and giving up one earned run. In early June, he moved into the starting rotation.

References

External links

1998 births
Living people
Sportspeople from Mission Viejo, California
Baseball players from California
Major League Baseball pitchers
St. Louis Cardinals players
UC Irvine Anteaters baseball players
United States national baseball team players
Chatham Anglers players
State College Spikes players
Springfield Cardinals players
Memphis Redbirds players
Glendale Desert Dogs players
2023 World Baseball Classic players